Zlatko Boško Tešanović (August 1, 1956 – July 26, 2012) was an Yugoslav-American theoretical condensed-matter physicist, whose work focused mainly on the high-temperature superconductors (HTS) and related materials.

His particular research interests were in the areas of theoretical condensed matter physics, revolving primarily around iron- and copper-based high-temperature superconductors, quantum Hall effects (QHE), superconductivity and strongly correlated electron materials. His broad knowledge of condensed matter physics, his deep understanding of the effects of strong magnetic fields, and his talent for exposition were influential.

Biography 
He was born in Sarajevo, former Yugoslavia (present Bosnia and Herzegovina). In 1979, he received a B.Sci. in physics from the University of Sarajevo. He then received a Fulbright Fellowship and attended the University of Minnesota, where he earned a Ph.D. in physics in 1985. He became a naturalized American citizen.

He worked as a professor of physics at Johns Hopkins University (JHU) in the Henry A. Rowland Department of Physics and Astronomy in Baltimore from July 1987 until his death on July 26, 2012. Previously, he served as director of the TIPAC Theory Center at JHU.

He was a foreign member of the Royal Norwegian Society of Sciences and Letters and a fellow of the APS Division of Condensed Matter Physics (DCMP). He served as a member of the Committee to Assess the Current Status and Future Direction of High Magnetic Field Science in the United States, and contributed strongly to it, until his death.

Students 
Among his graduate students are:
 Lei Xing (Jacob Haimson Professor, Stanford University)
 Igor F. Herbut (Professor, Simon Fraser University)
 Anton Andreev (Associate Professor, University of Washington)
 Sasha Dukan (Professor and Chair of Physics, Goucher College)
 Oskar Vafek (Associate Professor, Florida State University and NHMFL)
 Ashot Melikyan (Editor, Physical Review B)
 Andrés Concha (Postdoctoral Fellow, Harvard SEAS)
 Valentin Stanev (Postdoctoral Fellow, Argonne National Laboratory)
 Jian Kang (Grad student, Johns Hopkins University)

Works 
He gave more than 100 invited talks at scientific meetings, including major international conferences. He has authored and published more than 125 scientific papers, and a book entitled:

Honors and awards 
 Fulbright Fellowship, U.S. Institute of International Education (1980)
 Shevlin Fellowship, University of Minnesota (1983)
 Stanwood Johnston Memorial Fellowship, University of Minnesota (1984)
 J. R. Oppenheimer Fellowship, Los Alamos National Laboratory, 1985 (declined)
 David and Lucile Packard Foundation Fellowship (1988-1994)
 Inaugural Speaker, J. R. Schrieffer Tutorial Lecture Series, National High Magnetic Field Laboratory (1997)
 Foreign Member, The Royal Norwegian Society of Sciences and Letters
 Fellow, The American Physical Society, Division of Condensed Matter Physics

He received grants from the Department of Energy, and the National Science Foundation awarded him a post-doctoral fellowship that enabled him to spend two years studying at Harvard University.

Death 
He died on July 26, 2012, at the age of 55 of an "apparent" heart attack at the George Washington University Hospital in Washington, D.C., after collapsing at Reagan National Airport.

On March 23, 2013, the Johns Hopkins University Department of Physics and Astronomy organised a memorial symposium as a tribute to him. A number of distinguished speakers have been invited to highlight Zlatko's scientific accomplishments.

Quotations 
Among his sayings are the following:
 "There are only three numbers in the world: 0, 1, and Infinity. In fact, there are only two numbers because 0=1/Inf. So if it is not 0, then it is 1."

 "One should not get emotional with methods of steepest descent, but somehow I do. It will be like a light to you in dark rooms in the middle of the night, when you are despairing and everything else has failed you… and you will realize, the Method of Steepest Descent is your only true friend."

 "Superstringers have now created a culture in physics departments that is openly disdainful of experiments. ... There is an intellectual struggle going on for the very soul of theoretical physics, and for the hearts and minds of young scientists entering our field."

See also 

 List of American Physical Society Fellows (2011–)
 List of theoretical physicists
 Piers Coleman
 Alexei Alexeyevich Abrikosov
 Edward Witten
 Joseph Polchinski

Notes

References

External links 
 Are iron pnictides new cuprates? by Zlatko Tesanovic — American Physical Society
 Zlatko Tesanovic's Grave — Find a Grave
 Profile on Blogger — Blogger.com
 Zlatko Tesanovic: What is the theory of the Fe-pnictides?
 Curriculum vitae of Dr. Zlatko B. Tešanović

1956 births
2012 deaths
Scientists from Sarajevo
American string theorists
American condensed matter physicists
Yugoslav emigrants to the United States
Bosniaks of Bosnia and Herzegovina
Serbs of Bosnia and Herzegovina
Johns Hopkins University faculty
Fellows of the American Physical Society
Superconductivity
Death in Washington, D.C.